Aldo Javier Magaña Padilla (born 8 April 1996) is a Mexican professional footballer who plays as a forward.

Career

Youth
Magaña first joined Club León youth academy in 2009. He then transferred to Pachuca Youth Academy successfully going through U-15, U-17 and U-20. Magaña then returned to Club León U-20. Before receiving an opportunity to play in Costa Rica with first division team Guadalupe F.C.

Guadalupe F.C. (loan)
On June 2, 2017, Magaña signed with the Costa Rican club Guadalupe F.C. on a one-year loan to try his luck in a new league. On August 6, 2017, he made his professional debut in the   Costa Rica Primera División against Grecia, ending in a 3–0 loss. He managed to score 7 goals in 19 appearances becoming one of the top scorers during the season.

Celaya C.D. (loan)
On December 23, 2017, Magaña signed with Celaya C.D. to join on a short six months loan in the Liga Ascenso back in Mexico.

Honours
Herediano
Liga FPD: Apertura 2018, Apertura 2019
CONCACAF League: 2018

References

External links

Aldo Magana at La Teja

1996 births
Living people
Mexican footballers
Mexican expatriate footballers
Sportspeople from León, Guanajuato
Footballers from Guanajuato
Club León footballers
Guadalupe F.C. players
Club Celaya footballers
C.S. Herediano footballers
Club Puebla players
Municipal Grecia players
Liga FPD players
Liga MX players
Association football forwards
Mexican expatriate sportspeople in Costa Rica
Expatriate footballers in Costa Rica